Yoshua "Yoshi" Sudarso (born April 12, 1989) is an Indonesian-American actor.

Biography 
Sudarso was born in Surabaya, Indonesia to Indonesian parents of Chinese and Japanese descent. His family moved to Cerritos, California, when he was nine years old. He studied at Cal State Long Beach initially pursuing a career in math and accounting before eventually switching to theater. Sudarso also has one younger brother, Peter Adrian Sudarso, who is also an actor and model.

Career 
Sudarso began his career working in stunts working on major motion pictures and television shows such as The Maze Runner, Agents of S.H.I.E.L.D., Alita: Battle Angel and more.

Sudarso was a suit-actor for Power Rangers Samurai and Power Rangers Megaforce  before he was finally cast in a main role as Koda for Power Rangers Dino Charge.

He was cast as the lead in Mike Wiluan's Indonesian-language spaghetti western film Buffalo Boys. The film was the first project back in his home country. The movie became Singapore's submission for the Oscars Foreign Film category.

In August 2018, he joined the cast of the Manila-set independent drama Empty by Design and starred alongside Rhian Ramos, Osric Chau and Chris Pang. The same month, it was announced he joined the cast in a key supporting role in his second Indonesian-language project Milly & Mamet, a spin-off from Riri Riza's popular "Ada Apa Dengan Cinta?" franchise, alongside Sissy Priscilla and Dennis Adhiswara.

In 2022, Sudarso starred in the David Leitch action film, Bullet Train as the younger version of Hiroyuki Sanada's character, "the Elder."

Filmography

References

External links 
 
 Yoshi Sudarso on Twitter
 Yoshi Sudarso on Instagram

1989 births
American male actors of Chinese descent
American people of Chinese-Indonesian descent
California State University, Long Beach alumni
Indonesian people of Chinese descent
Living people
Indonesian emigrants to the United States